Ilie Năstase and Rosie Casals were the defending champions, but lost in the semifinals to Raúl Ramírez and Janet Newberry. Rain delays to the tournament necessitated matches from the fourth round, quarterfinals, semifinals and the final itself being completed on the last two days of the tournament. Davidson and King played three matches on the final day of the tournament to earn their victory, giving King the triple crown. No other player has won the triple crown at Wimbledon in the open era.

Owen Davidson and Billie Jean King defeated Ramírez and Newberry in the final, 6–3, 6–2 to win the mixed doubles tennis title at the 1973 Wimbledon Championships.

Seeds

  Ilie Năstase /  Rosie Casals (quarterfinals, withdrew)
  Owen Davidson /  Billie Jean King (champions)
  Alex Metreveli /  Olga Morozova (semifinals)
  Jimmy Connors /  Chris Evert (quarterfinals)

Draw

Finals

Top half

Section 1

Section 2

Section 3

Section 4

Bottom half

Section 5

Section 6

Section 7

Section 8

References

External links

1973 Wimbledon Championships – Doubles draws and results at the International Tennis Federation

X=Mixed Doubles
Wimbledon Championship by year – Mixed doubles